The Danish Urban Planning Award (Danish: Byplanprisen) is awarded annually to a Danish municipality by the Danish Town Planning Institute and the Architects' Association of Denmark. The ceremony takes place at the annual Danish Urban Planning Conference.

Recipients

2010s

2000s

References

External links
 Official website

Urban planning in Denmark
Architecture awards